Out in California is a live album by American artist Dave Alvin and the Guilty Men, released in 2002. It was recorded live in August 2001 in Santa Barbara and in January 2002 in Pasadena, California.

Reception

Writing for Allmusic, music critic Rick Anderson wrote of the album "As live albums tend to be, it's a curious mix of the familiar and the obscure."

Track listing
All songs by Dave Alvin unless otherwise noted.
"Out in California" (Dave Alvin, Tom Russell) – 6:49
"Haley's Comet" (Alvin, Russell) – 4:48	
"Little Honey/Who Do You Love?" (Dave Alvin, John Doe, Bo Diddley) – 9:21	
"Abilene" – 6:51	
"Don't Let Your Deal Go Down" – 7:32
"Highway 99" – 4:14	
"Andersonville" – 5:30	
"All 'Round Man" (Bo Carter) – 3:59	
"Blue Boulevard" (Alvin, Michael Woody) – 6:15
"Wanda and Duane" – 4:14
"4th of July" – 5:33
"American Music" – 7:01
"Everything's Gonna Be Alright" (Little Walter Jacobs) – 3:45

Personnel
Dave Alvin – vocals, guitar, National Steel guitar
Chris Gaffney – background vocals, accordion
Gregory Boaz – bass
Joe Terry – keyboards
Bobby Lloyd Hicks – drums, backing vocals
Greg Leisz – dobro, guitar
Rick Shea – guitar, pedal steel guitar, lap steel guitar, mandolin, backing vocals
Brantley Kearns – fiddle, backing vocals
John "Juke" Logan – harmonica

Production notes
Mark Linett – producer, engineer, mixing
Lou Beach – design
Issa Sharp – photography
Steve Smith – photography

References

2002 albums
Dave Alvin albums
HighTone Records albums